The Chautauqua adult education movement flourished in the late 19th and early 20th centuries, then declined.  However, some Independent Chautauquas still operate today, and these are the 21st century Chautauquas.  They are divided into two categories, Continuously Operating Chautauquas and Revival Chautauquas.

Continuously Operating Chautauquas
All references agree that at least these five Chautauquas have continued operations, without missing a year, from the heyday of the Chautauqua Movement (1920s or earlier) into the 21st Century:
 Chautauqua Institution (the original Chautauqua in New York State).
 Lakeside Chautauqua in Lakeside, Ohio
 Monteagle Sunday School Assembly in Monteagle, Tennessee
 Colorado Chautauqua in Boulder, Colorado
 New Piasa Chautauqua Chautauqua, Illinois

In addition, several other entities self-report that their activities constitute Continuously Operating Chautauquas:
 Bay View Association in Bay View, Michigan
 State of New Mexico Chautauqua program, operated by NM Humanities Council
 Martha's Vineyard Camp Meeting Association in Oak Bluffs, Massachusetts
 Ocean Grove Camp Meeting Association in Ocean Grove, New Jersey
 Miami Valley Chautauqua Association in Miamisburg, Ohio
 Fountain Park Chautauqua in Fountain Park, Indiana
 Ocean Park Association in Ocean Park, Maine
 Pennsylvania Chautauqua in Mt. Gretna, Pennsylvania
 various other Sunday School Assemblies

Revival Chautauquas
Some other organizations have honored the Chautauqua tradition by starting (or restarting) similar operations in the late 20th and early 21st centuries.  Examples include the following:
 Muskoka Chautauqua in Windermere, Ontario (1916-1932, 1997-present)
Lake Superior Big Top Chautauqua near Bayfield, WI Bayfield, WI
 Chautauqua-by-the-Sea at Ocean Park, Old Orchard Beach, Maine
 The annual Chautauqua Festival held in Wytheville, Virginia since 1985
 Chautauqua Andrews Valley Experience in Andrews, North Carolina
 The Florida Chautauqua Assembly held in DeFuniak Springs, Florida since 1996
 The New Piasa Chautauqua in Chautauqua, Illinois
 The Waxahachie Chautauqua held in Waxahachie, Texas since 2000
 The New Old Time Chautauqua  touring the Pacific Northwest since 1981
 The Greenville Chautauqua Society

References
 The Chautauqua Network of the Chautauqua Institution
 Galey, Mary (1981): The Grand Assembly: The Story of Life at the Colorado Chautauqua.   Boulder, Colorado: First Flatiron Press, .
 Pettem, Silvia (1998): Chautauqua Centennial, a Hundred Years of Programs http://www.silviapettem.com/books.html